22cans Ltd is a British video game developer based in Guildford. It was founded in February 2012 by Peter Molyneux, previously of Bullfrog Productions and Lionhead Studios.

History 
Peter Molyneux, who had previously founded Bullfrog Productions and Lionhead Studios, established 22cans on 20 February 2012 in Farnborough. To do so, he left Lionhead and partnered with Tim Rance and Peter Murphy, Lionhead's former chief technology officer and company director, respectively. Molyneux first announced the establishment on 7 March. By April that year, he had received more than 1,000 applications. Significant hires were Jack Attridge in July 2012 and Jamie Stowe in April 2013.

22cans' first game was Curiosity: What's Inside the Cube?, which was released for Android and iOS on 6 November 2012. In 2015, following the troubled launch of Godus, Simon Phillips was hired as the company's chief executive officer, replacing Molyneux, who would henceforth focus on game design. Attridge had left the studio by April 2015, while Godus designer, Konrad Naszynski, left in June 2016.

In February 2019, 22cans announced Legacy, a game inspired by Molyneux's first released game, The Entrepreneur (1984). The studio underwent an undisclosed number of layoffs in February 2021, though confirming that development would continue. Molyneux announced in December 2021 that Legacy will incorporate blockchain-based elements including non-fungible tokens, which will allow players to sell and purchase virtual goods as part of the business simulation gameplay.

Games developed

References

External links 
 

2012 establishments in England
British companies established in 2012
Companies based in Guildford
Video game companies established in 2012
Video game companies of the United Kingdom
Video game development companies